The Church of Saint Porphyrius or St. Porphyrius Church is a Greek Orthodox Christian church in Gaza City, State of Palestine, and the oldest active church in the city. Located in the Zaytun Quarter of the Old City of Gaza, it is named after the 5th century bishop of Gaza, Saint Porphyrius, whose tomb is situated in the northeastern corner of the church.

History
Original construction of the Church of Saint Porphyrius dates back to 425 CE, however the modern construction was undertaken by the Crusaders in the 1150s or 1160s and they dedicated it St. Porphyrius. Records from the 15th century show that dedication of the church was also attested to the Virgin Mary. In 1856, it was renovated. There are some cornices and bases that date back to the Crusader period, but much of the other portions are later additions.

In 2014, around 2,000 Palestinian Muslims fleeing Israeli bombings that had killed over 70 Palestinians took shelter in the Church of Saint Porphyirius. During the bombings, families slept in the corridors and rooms of the church and adjoining buildings, where they also had meals and medical care provided to them.

Architecture
The Church of Saint Porphyrius has a rectangular shape, ending with a half-domed roofed temple. The church consists of a single aisle made up of two groin-vaulted bays, with a projecting semi-circular apse preceded by a barrel-vaulted presbytery. It has architectural and constructional similarities with the former Cathedral of Saint John the Baptist (currently the Great Mosque of Gaza).

There are three entrances for the church: the western one has a portico with three marble columns supporting two pointed arches. The bases of the marbles date from the Crusader era. The church can also be entered from its façade or from a side door which opens onto a modern gallery, equipped with stairs for going down to the level of the pavement. Its colossal walls are supported by horizontal marble and granite columns and pilasters.

References

Bibliography

 (pp. 381-3
 

 

Churches completed in 1150
12th-century Eastern Orthodox church buildings
Churches in the Gaza Strip
Greek Orthodox churches
Greek Orthodoxy in the State of Palestine
Church buildings in the Kingdom of Jerusalem